Per-Alvar Magnusson (1958-2009) was a Swedish Olympic swimmer. Born on 29 June 1958 in Bollnäs, Gävleborg, he competed in the 4×200 m freestyle relay and the 4×100 m medley relay in the 1980 Summer Olympics. He died on 2 April 2009 in Sweden.

Clubs
Upsala SS

References

1958 births
Swimmers at the 1980 Summer Olympics
Olympic swimmers of Sweden
2009 deaths
Swedish male freestyle swimmers
World Aquatics Championships medalists in swimming
European Aquatics Championships medalists in swimming